The Australian Cricket Board Team of the Century was a theoretical cricket team selected by the Australian Cricket Board in 2000 as the best team of Australian cricketers in the 20th century.

Team 
 Bill Ponsford
 Arthur Morris
 Don Bradman (captain)
 Greg Chappell
 Neil Harvey
 Keith Miller (vice-captain) 
 Ian Healy (wicket-keeper)
 Ray Lindwall
 Shane Warne
 Dennis Lillee
 Bill O'Reilly
 Allan Border (12th man)

References 

2000 in Australian cricket
Cricket awards and rankings